The Oberliga Niedersachsen/Bremen was the fourth tier of the German football league system in the north of Germany, existing from 1994 to 2004. It covered the states of Lower Saxony and Bremen. With the re-formation of the Oberliga Nord in 2004, the league was disbanded.

Overview

The Oberliga Niedersachsen/Bremen started out in 1994 as a replacement for the Oberliga Nord, which was disbanded in that year. Along with this league, the Oberliga Hamburg/Schleswig-Holstein was formed to cover the other two of the four states the Oberliga Nord previously had served. The reason for the disbanding of the Oberliga Nord and the creation of two separate leagues in its stead was the formation of the Regionalliga Nord, which became the new third tier of league football in the north and covered exactly the same region as the Oberliga previously.

The league was formed from sixteen clubs, with twelve of them coming from the Verbandsliga Niedersachsen, three from the Verbandsliga Bremen and one from the Oberliga Nord. With the inception of this league, the Verbandsliga Niedersachsen split itself into two groups, east and west.

For the duration of the league's existence, it was fed by the three Verbandsligas of Bremen, Niedersachsen-West and Niedersachsen-Ost with the winners of these leagues gaining direct promotion to the Oberliga. Bremen, the smallest of the twenty-one German football associations, was the junior partner in this league, always only providing a small number of clubs.

The winner of the Oberliga was directly promoted to the Regionalliga from 1995 to 1999. In 2000, no promotion was available due to changes in the league system. From 2001 to 2004, the league champion had to play-off for promotion with the winner of the Oberliga Hamburg/Schleswig-Holstein. Only in 2004 could the champion of Niedersachsen/Bremen win this contest and gain promotion.

In 2000, with the reduction of the number of Regionalligas to two, eight clubs were relegated from this league to the Oberliga. The bottom seven clubs of the Oberliga were relegated that year and the league expanded to eighteen teams. The Regionalliga Nord now covered the complete northern half of Germany, not just the traditional region of the Oberliga Nord.

On these grounds it was decided in 2004 to reform a united Oberliga Nord which allowed direct promotion to its champion to the Regionalliga. The Oberliga Niedersachsen/Bremen was therefore disbanded. Its champion gained promotion to the Regionalliga this season, the clubs placed second to eighth were admitted to the new Oberliga. The other ten clubs in the league were relegated to the Verbandsligas.

In 2008, with the introduction of the new 3. Liga, the Oberliga Nord was disbanded again. The Oberligas Niedersachsen/Bremen and Hamburg/Schleswig-Holstein however were not reformed. Below the Regionalliga Nord the five Verbandsligas in the north functioned instead as the next level of play, making it, until 2012, the only region without an Oberliga and without direct promotion to the Regionalliga.

League champions
The league champions:

Placings in the league from 1994 to 2004 
The complete list of clubs in the league and their final placings:

 1 Atlas Delmenhorst withdrew from the league in 1999.

Key

Founding members of the league
The league was formed from sixteen clubs from two states in 1994, those being:

From the Oberliga Nord:
Preußen Hameln

From the Verbandsliga Bremen:
FC Mahndorf
SC Vahr
Bremer TS Neustadt

From the Verbandsliga Niedersachsen:
Atlas Delmenhorst
TSV Havelse 
BV Cloppenburg 
Sportfreunde Ricklingen 
SC Harsum 
TuS Esens 
SpVg Aurich 
TuS Lingen 
Blau-Weiß Lohne 
SpVgg Göttingen 
Arminia Hannover 
Hannover 96 II

Disbanding of the league
The league was disbanded in 2004 and replaced by the Oberliga Nord. Its clubs were spread between the Regionalliga Nord, Oberliga Nord and the three Verbandsligas:

To the Regionalliga Nord:
VfL Wolfsburg II

To the Oberliga Nord:
Eintracht Nordhorn 
SV Wilhelmshaven 
BV Cloppenburg 
Hannover 96 II
Kickers Emden 
Arminia Hannover 
SV Meppen

To the Verbandsliga Bremen:
FC Oberneuland
SC Weyhe

To the Verbandsliga Niedersachsen-Ost:
Eintracht Braunschweig II
Rotenburger SV
SSV Vorsfelde
Lüneburger SK

To the Verbandsliga Niedersachsen-West:
VfB Oldenburg
SC Langenhagen
VfV 06 Hildesheim

Team withdrawn:
Concordia Ihrhove

References

Sources
 Deutschlands Fußball in Zahlen,  An annual publication with tables and results from the Bundesliga to Verbandsliga/Landesliga. DSFS.
 Kicker Almanach,  The yearbook on German football from Bundesliga to Oberliga, since 1937. Kicker Sports Magazine.
 Die Deutsche Liga-Chronik 1945-2005  History of German football from 1945 to 2005 in tables. DSFS. 2006.

External links 
 Das deutsche Fussball Archiv  Historic German league tables
 The Lower Saxony Football Association (NFV)  
 The Bremen Football Association (BFV)  
 Northern German Football Association (NFV)  

Nie
Football competitions in Bremen (state)
Football competitions in Lower Saxony
1994 establishments in Germany
2004 disestablishments in Germany
Sports leagues established in 1994
Sports leagues disestablished in 2004
Ger